Phan Huỳnh Điểu (11 November 1924, in Đà Nẵng – 29 June 2015) was a Vietnamese composer.  He composed the military anthem :vi:Đoàn Vệ quốc quân (1945), and was a recipient of the Hồ Chí Minh Prize in 2000.

Works

Mùa đông binh sĩ (1946)
Những người đã chết
Tình trong lá thiếp (1955)
Quê tôi ở miền Nam
Nhớ ơn Hồ Chủ tịch
Ra tiền tuyến
Đội kèn tí hon (1959)
Những em bé ngoan (1959)
Nhớ ơn Bác (1959)
Anh ở đầu sông em cuối sông
Những ánh sao đêm (1962)
Có một đàn chim
Bóng cây Kơ-nia (1971)
Cuộc đời vẫn đẹp sao (1971)
Đây thôn Vỹ Dạ
Đêm nay anh ở đâu
Giải phóng quân
Hành khúc ngày và đêm (1972)
Nhớ (1973)
Ở hai đầu nỗi nhớ
Đà Nẵng ơi, chúng con đã về (1975)
Sợi nhớ sợi thương (1978)
Quảng Nam yêu thương
Thơ tình cuối mùa thu
Thuyền và biển
Tương tư chiều
Hát về thành phố quê hương (1997)
Khi không còn em nữa (1992)
Tiếng thu
Bạn đến chơi nhà
Làm cây thông reo
Người ấy bây giờ đang ở đâu
Tình ca Đămbri
Tia nắng
Chiều tím
Nhớ lắm chiều nay
Tìm em bên giếng nước
Thư Tình Cuối Mùa Thu (lyrics Xuân Quỳnh)

References 

Vietnamese composers
1924 births
2015 deaths
Ho Chi Minh Prize recipients